The 2012 FIBA Stanković Continental Champions' Cup, or 2012 FIBA Mini World Cup, officially called Dongfeng Yueda KIA FIBA Stanković Continental Champions' Cup 2012, was the 9th annual FIBA Stanković Continental Champions' Cup tournament. It was held in Guangzhou, China, from July 6 to 10.

Participating teams

Game results 
All 4 teams played a round-robin tournament first. The top 2 teams advanced to final while the other 2 teams fought for the 3rd place.

Round-robin 

 All time UTC+8.

Third-place Playoff

Final

Final standings

Individual awards

All-Star Five
 Jason Cadee ( Australia)
 Sun Yue ( China)
 Zhu Fangyu ( China)
 Yi Jianlian ( China)
 Wang Zhizhi ( China)

External links 
  

2012
2012–13 in Chinese basketball
2012–13 in Australian basketball
2012–13 in Russian basketball
2012 in Tunisian sport